The Electoral Leftist Alliance or Left was a  movement of Marxist–Leninist, Maoist and Trotskyist organisations in Austria which was founded by the Communist Initiative, the Socialist Left Party, the League of the Socialist Revolution and other left-wing movements and activists in the run-up to the 2008 legislative election. The Communist Party of Austria was also invited to participate, but it stated that the timeframe was too short and that it would stand on its own instead, while supporting the unification of the left in principle.

References

2008 establishments in Austria
Communist parties in Austria
Left-wing political party alliances
Political parties established in 2008
Political party alliances in Austria
Austria